Robert Lindstedt and Jonny O'Mara were the defending champions but chose not to defend their title.

André Göransson and Ben McLachlan won the title after defeating Treat Huey and John-Patrick Smith 6–7(4–7), 7–6(9–7), [11–9] in the final.

Seeds

Draw

References

External links
 Main draw

Odlum Brown Vancouver Open - Men's doubles
2022 Men's doubles